Breton Americans are Americans of Breton descent from Brittany. An estimated 100,000 Bretons emigrated from Brittany to the United States between 1880 and 1980.

History
A large wave of Breton immigrants arrived in the New York City area during the 1950s and 1960s. Many settled in the East Elmhurst neighborhood of Queens. However, more than 10,000 Bretons  left their native land to emigrate to New York. They integrated very easily because their heritage is similar to that of the Irish but are still very attached to their homeland.

There is also a Breton soccer team in Queens.

Notable people

John James Audubon
Celine Dion
René Galand
Charles Guillou
Youenn Gwernig
Paol Keineg
Jack Kerouac
Yann LeCun
Jackie Stallone
Sylvester Stallone
Tina Weymouth

See also

Breton soccer teams in New York

References

External links
Breizh Amerika

 
French American